Liebenfels is a market town in the district of Sankt Veit an der Glan in the Austrian state of Carinthia.

Geography

The municipal area is situated on the southern slopes of the Gurktal Alps.

The municiplatiy comprises the cadastral communities of Freundsam, Glantschach, Gradenegg, Hardegg, Liebenfels proper, Liemberg, Pflausach, Rosenbichl, Rottschaft Feistritz, Sörg, and Sörgerberg.

History
While the oldest archaeological findings in the area date back to the Neolithic, the foundation of an ancient temple were discovered on a hill near the village of Hohenstein. The building was erected in the 2nd century AD, when the area was part of the Roman Noricum province, and dedicated to the local Celtic goddess Noreia.

The building of church in the village of Glantschach was documented between 958 and 991. Located near the central Zollfeld area in the Duchy of Carinthia, Liebenfels is the site of numerous medieval castles and residences, most notably Liebenfels Castle which was first mentioned as Liewenvelse in a 1312 deed.

References

External links

Municipal website 

Cities and towns in Sankt Veit an der Glan District